Lanuginellinae is a subfamily of glass sponges belonging to the family Rossellidae.

References

 Gray, J.E. 1872a. Notes on the Classification of the Sponges. Annals and Magazine of Natural History (4) 9(54), page 450

External links
 
 
 

Hexactinellida
Sponge subfamilies